During the 1948–49 English football season, Everton F.C. competed in the Football League First Division.

In October 1948 Theo Kelly, the Everton manager, resigned reverting to his old job of club secretary with Cliff Britton returning to the club as manager.

Final league table

P = Matches played; W = Matches won; D = Matches drawn; L = Matches lost; F = Goals for; A = Goals against; GA = Goal average; GD = Goal difference; Pts = Points

Results

Football League First Division

FA Cup

Squad

References

Everton F.C. seasons
English football clubs 1948–49 season